The 5th annual Venice International Film Festival was held between 10 August and 3 September 1937. The new Palazzo del Cinema building was completed for this year's festival. It has been used as the venue since, excluding the years 1940 to 1948.

Jury
 Giuseppe Volpi di Misurata (president) (Italy)
 Luigi Chiarini (Italy)
 Sandro De Feo (Italy)
 Luigi Freddi (Italy)
 Mario Gromo (Italy)
 René Jeanne (France)
 Neville Kearney (UK)
 Oswald Lehnich (Germany)
 Karl Meltzer (Germany)
 Georges Lourau (France)
 Ryszard Ordynski (Poland)
 Esodo Pratelli (Italy)
 Louis Vilani (Hungary)

In-Competition films
 A Star Is Born by William A. Wellman
 Der Herrscher by Veit Harlan
 Elephant Boy by Robert J. Flaherty
 Kid Galahad by Michael Curtiz
 La grande illusion by Jean Renoir
 Les perles de la couronne by Christian-Jaque, Sacha Guitry
 Marked Woman by Lloyd Bacon
 Scipione l'africano by Carmine Gallone
 Shall We Dance by Mark Sandrich
 Theodora Goes Wild by Ryszard Bolesławski
 Victoria the Great by Herbert Wilcox
 Winterset by Alfred Santell
 Un carnet de bal by Julien Duvivier

Awards
 Best Foreign Film: Un carnet de bal by Julien Duvivier
 Best Italian Film: Scipione l'africano by Carmine Gallone
 Volpi Cup:
 Best Actor: Emil Jannings for Der Herrscher
 Best Actress: Bette Davis for Kid Galahad and Marked Woman
 Special Recommendation:
 Batalión by Miroslav Cikán
 Kōjō no Tsuki by Keisuke Sasaki
 Mária növér by Viktor Gertler
 Sant Tukaram by Vishnupant Govind Damle, Sheikh Fattelal
 The Flying Doctor by Miles Mander
 Honorable Mention:
 Barbara Radziwillówna by Joseph Lejtes
  by Eugeniusz Cekalski, Stanislaw Wohl
 Best Director: Elephant Boy by Robert J. Flaherty, Zoltán Korda
 Best Screenplay: Les perles de la couronne by Sacha Guitry, Christian-Jaque
 Best Cinematography: Winterset by J. Peverell Marley

References

External links 

Venice Film Festival 1937 Awards on IMDb

V
Venice Film Festival
1937 film festivals
Film
August 1937 events
September 1937 events